Eyeworks is an Amsterdam-based international television production company founded by Reinout Oerlemans, Robert van den Bogaard and Ronald van Wechem. As of June 2014, it is a wholly owned subsidiary of the Warner Bros. Television Group and rebranded as Warner Bros. International Television Production.

History
On February 26, 2003, Eyeworks acquired a 45% stake in RTL's Stormy Entertainment.

On February 8, 2006, Eyeworks acquired New Zealand production company Touchdown Television. They later acquired Egmond Film & Television on September 10, 2006. Fourteen days later, Eyeworks acquired a 50% stake in U.S. production company, 3 Ball Productions. On August 16, 2007, Eyeworks acquired Cuatro Cabezas, an Argentine production company that was founded in 1993 by joint CEOs Diego Guebel and Mario Pergolini.

On March 22, 2013, Eyeworks announced they will move their headquarters to the HES building in center Amsterdam. The HES building began serving as the headquarters in summer 2013. The new headquarters was later opened on September 5, 2013.

On February 11, 2014, the Warner Bros. Television Group announced that it will purchase Eyeworks' businesses outside of the United States. The acquisition was completed on June 2 of that year. The acquisition gives Warner Bros. TV production units in 15 additional territories.

Companies

Eyeworks UK

Eyeworks UK (formerly At It Productions) is a British TV production company set up in 1997 by Martin Cunning and Chris Fouracre. At It are predominantly linked with youth and entertainment shows (it is a major supplier of music programmes to Channel 4), but over the last three years have branched out into a series of other fields such as medical documentaries and quiz shows. In July 2007, the company was bought by International production group Eyeworks. In April 2014. ITV produced Amazing Greys a co production between ITV Studios & Eyeworks.

The company is currently headed by Chris Fouracre (MD), Martin Cunning (MD), Lee-Anne Richardson (Head of Production) Paul Day (Director of Branded Content) and Rebecca Ackland (Head of International).

Eyeworks Touchdown
Eyeworks Touchdown (formerly Touchdown Television) is a New Zealand-based television production company founded in 1991 by Julie Christie that specializes in  entertainment, lifestyle, sport and factual series, and reality game shows. Among programs Touchdown produced are How Normal Are You?,  So You Wannabe A Popstar, and Miss Popularity, among others. ·On February 8, 2006, Eyeworks acquired Touchdown and it was later renamed to Eyeworks Touchdown on April 1, 2006.

Eyeworks Cuatro Cabezas

Cuatro Cabezas (meaning Four Heads in English and a.k.a. 4K) was founded in 1993 by Diego Guebel and Mario Pergolini. In 2008, Mario Pergolini sold all his shares of the company for the Dutch production company Eyeworks, so from then on it has been called Eyeworks Cuatro Cabezas.

Eyeworks Egmond

On September 10, 2006, Egmond Film & Television was acquired by Eyeworks and was renamed to Eyeworks Egmond.

Eyeworks Brazil

In 2011, the company took the original name of the branch from outside, at Brazil exhibition, and called then Eyeworks.

Commissions
Its biggest commission to date is the T4 strand which runs every weekend morning and during the school holidays on Channel 4. It is an irreverent mix of interviews, sketches and comedy that runs in between the usual morning shows. The current hosts are Steve Jones, Miquita Oliver, Alexa Chung and Rick Edwards. It is worth mentioning that this is also where presenters such as Vernon Kaye, June Sarpong and Dermot O'Leary began their careers.

Eyeworks most recent commissions include the TV music show Transmission with T-Mobile. This ran in mid-2006 and featured some up-and-coming bands like New Young Pony Club and Kasabian. Pete Doherty was famously reunited with his ex-girlfriend Kate Moss during one of the shows. The second series aired in early 2007, followed by a third later that year. Transmission with T-Mobile was the first of a number of branded content projects which has led to the company being recognised as a leader in Branded content TV.

Hider in the House has also been a great success for the company.  The second series of this children's format, where children hide celebrities in the parents' house, won the Rose Dor for Best Entertainment Programme.

Eyeworks has also produced a number of factual programmes for the UK Extraordinary People and Bodyshock strands.  Most notable of these has been the acclaimed Half Ton Mum and award-winning Born Without a Face (Golden Eagle Award 2006).  The latter marked the company's expansion into the factual genre.

Other memorable productions include:
Popworld, T4's music programme, originally hosted by Simon Amstell and Miquita Oliver, then Alex Zane and Alexa Chung. The show has now finished.
The Facemakers, a ten-part series that aired on Discovery U.S. looking at a children's facial surgery unit

References

External links

Television production companies of the Netherlands
Pan-European media companies
Mass media in Amsterdam
Warner Bros. Television Studios